Shadani Darbar is a historic Hindu temple in Raipur Hindustan and Pakistan. It is located in Hayat Pitafi, Mirpur Mathelo Taluka, Ghotki District in the Sindh Province of Pakistan. It is said to be the biggest Hindu temple in Sindh. The temple is visited by devotees from Pakistan but also from India.

History
The foundation of Shadani Darbar was laid by Sant Shadaram Sahib in 1786. The Sant Shadaram is a great Hindu saint who was born in 1708 in Lahore.

Annual Celebration

Three day celebrations are held in the temple annually during the birth anniversary of Sant Shadaram. During these days, Agni Pooja is conducted and the recitation of Bhagavad Gita and Guru Grinth Sahib takesplace. Mass wedding of poor Hindus are also conducted by the temple authorities during these days. Pilgrims from India visit the temple during these celebrations.

See also
 Ramapir Temple Tando Allahyar
 Umarkot Shiv Mandir
 Hinglaj Mata mandir
 Baba Ram Thaman Shrine

References 

Ghotki District
Hinduism in Sindh
Hindu temples in Sindh